This is a list of governors of the Federal District, Brazil. The Federal District is one of 27 federative units of Brazil. In its territory is located the federal capital, Brasília, in the interior of the country. Prior to 1960, the former Federal District in its territory had located the city of Rio de Janeiro; when the federal capital was relocated to Brasília, the former federal district became Guanabara State, which after 15 years of autonomy, was merged with Rio de Janeiro State in 1975.

Governors of the Federal District (1960–present)

Governors of the Federal District (1889–1960)

References

Governors of the Federal District (Brazil)
Distrito Federal